The Diamond Head Anthology: Am I Evil? is a compilation album by British heavy metal band Diamond Head, released via Sanctuary Records. It features some of their most famous songs, which have been remastered. The album also features two live versions and an acoustic version of the song "Lightning to the Nations".

Track listing

References 

2004 compilation albums
Diamond Head (band) compilation albums